1998–2003
 2003–2006
 2007–present

Nikola Stojić (born 15 December 1974 in Belgrade, SR Serbia, Yugoslavia) is a rower from Serbia, who competed in four consecutive Summer Olympics, starting in 2000. He won the silver medal in the men's single sculls event at the 2005 Mediterranean Games in Almería, Spain.

In 2006, the Olympic Committee of Serbia decided to declare him the sportsman of the year.

Stojić graduated from Brown University in 1997. During his time at Brown, Stojić rowed on the school's team.

References

1974 births
Living people
Serbian male rowers
Olympic rowers of Serbia
Olympic rowers of Serbia and Montenegro
Rowers at the 2000 Summer Olympics
Rowers at the 2004 Summer Olympics
Rowers at the 2008 Summer Olympics
Rowers at the 2012 Summer Olympics
Sportspeople from Belgrade
European champions for Serbia
World Rowing Championships medalists for Yugoslavia
Mediterranean Games silver medalists for Serbia
Mediterranean Games bronze medalists for Serbia
Competitors at the 2005 Mediterranean Games
Competitors at the 2009 Mediterranean Games
Competitors at the 2013 Mediterranean Games
World Rowing Championships medalists for Serbia
World Rowing Championships medalists for Serbia and Montenegro
Mediterranean Games medalists in rowing
European Rowing Championships medalists

Brown University School of Engineering alumni